Shabir Khan (born 10 November 1985) is a footballer who plays for Worcester City, as a defender. He has spent his entire career at Worcester, having progressed through their youth system. He joined Gloucester City on a one-month loan deal in December 2006 and Stourport Swifts on loan in September 2011.

Born in England, he made his international debut for Pakistan in 2010.

Club career
Born in Worcester, England, Khan came up through the youth system at Worcester City, and broke into the first team in 2004, making his debut against Cambridge City in February that year. On 7 December 2006 he joined Gloucester City on loan. He made his debut for the Tigers on 9 December 2006 in a 2–0 defeat to Cheshunt. In 2015, he was red carded while playing for Worcester City during a game against Stockport County when he performed a belly-to-belly suplex on Charlie Russell. He was however not fined or suspended for this incident.

International career
Because his father is of Pakistani descent who was born in Pakistan, Shabir Khan is eligible to play for the Pakistan National Football Team.

Khan was called to represent the Pakistan national football team for the SAFF Cup 2009 in Bangladesh in December 2009, where he scored against Bhutan.

And after a three-year hiatus, Khan returned to international action, taking part in friendlies against Singapore in November 2012 and later in February 2013 against Nepal and Maldives.

Honours
Worcester City
PASE Youth League Northern Division (1): 2003–04
Worcestershire FA Youth Player of Season (1): 2003–04

References

External links
 

1985 births
Living people
English people of Pakistani descent
Pashtun people
Southern Football League players
Gloucester City A.F.C. players
English footballers
Pakistani footballers
Pakistani expatriate footballers
Association football fullbacks
Sportspeople from Worcester, England
Pakistan international footballers
Worcester City F.C. players
Stourport Swifts F.C. players
British Asian footballers
British sportspeople of Pakistani descent